The Springfield Anglican College (TSAC) is an independent Anglican co-educational early learning, primary and secondary day school, located in Springfield, a suburb of the City of Ipswich in South East Queensland, Australia.

The college comprises two campuses, the early learning centre and primary school from Kindergarten to Year 6, located on Springfield College Drive; and the secondary school from Year 7 to Year 12) on the Springfield - Greenbank Arterial. The college has outlined scheduled building developments across both campuses out to 2022. Upon completion it is expected the college will have capacity for 1,000 students.

History 

The Springfield Anglican College was established on 4 May 1998 as The Springfield College (TSC), with an enrolment of twelve students. Student numbers have grown quickly and it now has an estimated enrolment of over 950 students, from Prep (pre-school) to Year Twelve.

In 2007, enrolments outgrew facilities - a result of the delayed start of the new Middle/Senior School campus - and Senior School students (Years Ten to Twelve) were transferred to sister school Forest Lake College.

The college was originally a joint initiative of the Anglican Church of Australia and the Uniting Church in Australia and until 2009 was operated by EDUCANG along with Mary McConnel School, Forest Lake,  The FLC International Centre and The Lakes College. In October 2009, sole ownership of Forest Lake College (FLC) and The Springfield College (TSC) was assumed by the Anglican Diocese of Brisbane and a new board was appointed to EDUCANG. The Uniting Church in Australia had previously taken sole ownership of The Lakes College at Mango Hill.

On 4 November 2010, a new entity FSAC Ltd (Forest Lake and Springfield Anglican Colleges) took over the governances of the two colleges from EDUCANG and renamed the colleges - St John's Anglican College and The Springfield Anglican College. "Rebranding" would commence immediately with the names to officially take effect on 1 January 2011.

In 2017, Students with an OP score of 1-5 were numbered at 18. Resulting in the School's overall ranking increasing significantly from 134th place to 1st. Staff attendance was noted at 98.4%, while student attendance was noted at 93.66% across all campuses and grades.

College clans 
The Springfield Anglican College has four clans, named in honour of some of Scotland's proudest and most historic families. Each clan has its own crest, which is displayed on the student's sports uniform.

Sport

The Associated Schools sports
The Springfield Anglican College sporting program is centred on membership of The Associated Schools (TAS) for students in Years 8–12, and Junior TAS Competition (JTAS) for students in Years 4–7.

All TAS sport is played on Saturdays over 3 trimesters. Each trimester is approximately nine weeks.

See also

List of schools in Queensland
List of Anglican schools in Australia

References

External links
 The Springfield Anglican College website
 Greater Springfield Primary & Secondary Schools
 Greater Springfield - Springfield City Group

Anglican high schools in Queensland
Defunct Uniting Church schools in Australia
Anglican primary schools in Queensland
Educational institutions established in 1998
Schools in Ipswich, Queensland
1998 establishments in Australia
The Associated Schools member schools